Henrik Otto Donner (16 November 1939 – 26 June 2013) was a Finnish composer, musician and all-round music personality. His musical styles varied from pop and rock music to jazz, electronic music and contemporary classical music. Donner's personal instrument was trumpet. He was a member of the famous Finland Swedish Donner family.

Donner was one of the pioneers of Finnish avant-garde and experimental music as well as an important figure in Finnish left-wing "song movement" of the 1960s and 1970s. He studied at the Sibelius Academy in Helsinki and later in Vienna as a student of György Ligeti. In 1966 Donner was one of the founders of record label Love Records which was a pioneering label in Finnish rock music. Donner collaborated with many Finnish musicians and artists such as Erkki Kurenniemi, Juhani Aaltonen, A. W. Yrjänä, Hasse Walli and Dave Lindholm. He was a film score composer for more than 50 movies and TV-series.

Henrik Otto Donner was found dead at the marina of Jakobstad early on 27 June 2013. It is yet uncertain whether he drowned or died of a heart attack.

See also
Finnish jazz musicians
Music of Finland

References

External links

Jazz Finland
2014 MWE3.com interview with Jim Pembroke remembering Otto Donner
CD review from 2000 of Jim Pembroke's 1980 album produced by Otto Donner

1939 births
2013 deaths
Musicians from Tampere
Donner family
Finnish male composers
Finnish jazz composers
Finnish film score composers
Male film score composers
Finnish jazz musicians
Finnish electronic musicians
Music industry executives
Finnish socialists
Finnish trumpeters
Male jazz composers